John Bushell (March 18, 1715   January 22, 1761) was the first printer in what is now Canada.

Biography
Bushell was born in Boston, Massachusetts and was apprenticed as a printer there. He subsequently worked for a number of different printers and had his own printing business until 1751, when he left for Halifax, Nova Scotia.

A partner of Bushell's, Bartholomew Green, following a century-long family tradition in the trade, had left Boston for Halifax in October 1751 and brought all the necessary equipment to set up a printing shop. He died shortly after his arrival and Bushell went to Halifax to continue the business.

Bushell's first publication was issued from his shop on Grafton Street on March 23, 1752. The Halifax Gazette was published as a subscription newspaper and was a single broadside sheet, printed on both sides. This probably was the first work of any kind printed in Canada. He went on to print the Gazette and became the King's printer until his death, when the Gazette and the role of King's printer were taken up by Anthony Henry. The paper's content ranged from elegies, to excerpts from notable publications of the day, notices of upcoming dramatic productions around Halifax, and advertisements from booksellers about newly arrived books.

Bushell's paper also advertised the availability of his press for miscellaneous printing jobs. This was not enough to keep him out of insolvency, and he was in debt during most of his life in Halifax.

Bushell died in February, 1761, leaving  one son and a daughter. The son was sent to Portsmouth, New Hampshire, in the British colonies in America, and entered into an apprenticeship with Daniel Fowle, an accomplished printer who owned and published the New Hampshire Gazette.

See also
 Early American publishers and printers

References

Sources
 
 
 

1761 deaths
Canadian printers
Canadian newspaper publishers (people)
18th-century Canadian newspaper publishers (people)
1715 births
People from colonial Boston
People of colonial Massachusetts
Colonial American printers